Results from Norwegian football in 1953.

1952–53 league season

Hovedserien

Group A

Group B

Championship final
June 21: Larvik Turn - Skeid 3-2

Landsdelsserien

Group Østland/Søndre

Østland/Nordre

Group Sørland/Vestland, A1

Group Sørland/Vestland, A2

Group Sørland/Vestland, B

Group Møre

Group Trøndelag

Promotion play-offs

Sørland/Vestland
Flekkefjord - Djerv 1919 3-2

Flekkefjord - Nordnes 2-2 (extra time)

Flekkefjord - Nordnes 2-3

Nordnes promoted.

Møre/Trøndelag
Langevåg - Freidig 0-1

Freidig promoted.

First Division

District I
 1. Askim (Promoted)
 2. Greåker
 3. Mysen
 4. Rapid
 5. Sprint
 6. Østsiden
 7. Rakkestad
 8. Kvik (Halden)

District II, Group A
 1. Sagene (Play-off)
 2. Drammens BK
 3. Stabæk
 4. Kongsberg
 5. Strømsgodset
 6. Mjøndalen
 7. Nydalen
 8. Mercantile/Trygg

District II, Group B
 1. Sandaker (Play-off)
 2. Aurskog
 3. Spartacus
 4. Aasen
 5. Grei
 6. Bjørkelangen
 7. Kjelsås
 8. Raumnes/Årnes

District III
 1. Raufoss (Play-off)
 2. Gjøvik/Lyn
 3. Hamar IL
 4. Vang
 5. Mesna
 6. Vardal
 7. Fremad
 8. Biri

District IV, Group A
 1. Eik (Play-off)
 2. Tønsberg Turn
 3. Kragerø
 4. Urædd
 5. Flint
 6. Skiens-Grane
 7. Runar
 8. Teie

District IV, Group B
 1. Skiens BK (Play-off)
 2. Borg
 3. Storm
 4. Ulefoss
 5. Brevik
 6. Rjukan
 7. Skade
 8. Stag

District V, Group A1 (Aust-Agder)
 1. Arendals BK (Play-off)
 2. Grane (Arendal)
 3. Nedenes
 4. Risør
 5. Rygene

District V, Group A2 (Vest-Agder)
 1. AIK Lund (Play-off)
 2. Vigør
 3. Vindbjart
 4. Bakke
 5. Farsund
 6. Våg

District V, Group B1 (Rogaland)
 1. Buøy (Promoted)
 2. Jarl
 3. Varhaug
 4. Vidar
 5. Vigrestad
 6. Orre

District V, Group B2 (Rogaland)
 1. Kopervik (Promoted)
 2. Haugar
 3. Randaberg
 4. Torvastad
 5. Brodd
 6. Pol

District VI, Group A (Bergen)
 1. Fjellkameratene (Play-off)
 2. Minde
 3. Laksevåg
 4. Bergens-Sparta
 5. Sandviken
 6. Trane
 7. Frøya

District VI, Group B (Midthordland)
 1. Dale (Dalekvam) (Play-off)
 2. Florvåg
 3. Fana
 4. Erdal
 5. Eidsvåg (Åsane)
 6. Kjøkkelvik
 7. Søfteland

District VII, Group A (Sunnmøre/Romsdal)
 1. Rollon (Promoted)
 2. Spjelkavik
 3. Sykkylven
 4. Åndalsnes
 5. Skarbøvik
 6. Volda
 7. Isfjorden

District VII, Group B (Nordmøre/Romsdal)
 1. Halsa (Promoted)
 2. Braatt
 3. Nordlandet
 4. Goma
 5. Sunndal
 6. Averøykam.
 7. Eide
 8. Framtid

District VIII, Group A1 (Sør-Trøndelag)
 1. Hommelvik (Play-off)
 2. Heimdal
 3. Melhus
 4. Flå
 5. Leik
 6. Hovin

District VIII, Group A2 (Sør-Trøndelag)
 1. Løkken (Play-off)
 2. Orkanger
 3. Troll
 4. Svorkmo
 5. Oppdal
 6. Kyrksæterøra

District VIII, Group B (Trondheim og omegn)
 1. Wing (Play-off)
 2. Rosenborg
 3. Nidar
 4. Tryggkameratene
 5. Trond
 6. Ørn (Trondheim)

District VIII, Group C (Fosen)
 1. Opphaug (Play-off)
 2. Lensvik
 3. Stadsbygd
 4. Fevåg
 5. Beian
 6. Uthaug

District VIII, Group D (Nord-Trøndelag)
 1. Sverre (Play-off)
 2. Verdal
 3. Stjørdal
 4. Malm
 5. Blink
 6. Skogn

Play-off District II/III
Raufoss - Sandaker 0-0

Sandaker - Sagene 2-5

Sagene - Raufoss 2-1

Final table

Championship District II
Sandaker - Sagene 2-5

Play-off District IV
Eik - Skiens BK 6-1

Skiens BK - Eik 2-1 (agg. 3–7)

Eik promoted.

Play-off District V, Group A
AIK Lund - Arendals BK 3-2

Arendals BK - AIK Lund 0-1 (agg. 2–4)

AIK Lund promoted.

Championship District V, Group B
Buøy - Kopervik?

Kopervik - Buøy 6-1 (in Egersund)

Play-off District VI
Fjellkameratene - Dale 5-2

Dale - Fjellkameratene 2-1 (agg. 4–6)

Fjellkameratene promoted.

Championship District VII
Rollon - Halsa 3-3 (extra time)

Rollon - Halsa 0-1 (in Molde)

Championship District VIII
Hommelvik - Løkken?

Sverre - Wing 0-2

Opphaug - Løkken 0-1

Wing - Opphaug 2-3

Løkken - Sverre 2-9

Løkken - Wing 0-3

Opphaug - Sverre 1-7

Final Table District VIII

Norwegian Cup

Final

Northern Norwegian Cup

Final

National team

Note: Norway's goals first 
Explanation:
WCQ = 1954 FIFA World Cup Qualifier

References

 
Seasons in Norwegian football